Erwin Krüger Urroz (November 2, 1915 in León, Nicaragua – July 28, 1973 in Managua) was a Nicaraguan folklore poet and singer.

He was born in León, Nicaragua to a German father and Nicaraguan mother.

References

20th-century Nicaraguan poets
Nicaraguan male poets
Nicaraguan people of German descent
1915 births
1973 deaths
People from León, Nicaragua
20th-century Nicaraguan male singers
20th-century male writers